Gravenhurst railway station is located in the community of Gravenhurst in Ontario, Canada.  It was a stop for Northlander trains of Ontario Northland Railway before service was discontinued in 2012.

In 2021 the Government of Ontario announced plans to restore service using ONR from this station north to either Timminis or Cochrane by the mid 2020s.

The Muskoka Rails Museum is now housed in the station. The south building has a coffee shop and veterinary services.

References

External links 

Ontario Northland Railway stations
Railway stations in the District Municipality of Muskoka
Railway stations closed in 2012
Railway museums in Ontario
Disused railway stations in Canada